Aglaia aherniana is a species of plant in the family Meliaceae. It is endemic to the Philippines.

References

Flora of the Philippines
aherniana
Vulnerable plants
Taxonomy articles created by Polbot